Heiti Hääl (born 10 May 1963) is an Estonian entrepreneur and sport personality.

He was born in Tallinn. In 1986, he graduated from Tallinn University of Technology's Faculty of Engineering.

Since 1994, he is a member of the board of Estonian Equestrian Federation (2000–2013 its chairman). He is one of the organizers of Tallinn International Horse Show, and its main sponsor. He is also the chairman of the board of AS Alexela Logistics.

Awards:
 2017: Decoration of the Estonian Olympic Committee
 2019: Order of the White Star, III class
 2020: award "Spordisõber 2020"

References

Living people
1963 births
Estonian businesspeople
Estonian sportspeople
Recipients of the Order of the White Star, 3rd Class
Tallinn University alumni
Sportspeople from Tallinn